Félix Arturo González Canto (born 23 August 1968) is a Mexican politician and economist, affiliated with the Institutional Revolutionary Party (PRI). From 2005 until 2011 he was the governor of the state of Quintana Roo.

He has previously held the positions of mayor (Presidente Municipal) of his home town of Cozumel (1999–2002) and has served as a deputy in the Federal Congress (2003–2005, representing Quintana Roo's First District). During 2004 he also served as a representative of Mexico to the Central American Parliament.

External links
Represion from the Governor Félix González Canto
Videos de la salvaje represión en Cancún del sábado 20 de agosto que la TV no se atrevió a transmitir.

Municipal presidents in Quintana Roo
Members of the Chamber of Deputies (Mexico)
Governors of Quintana Roo
Institutional Revolutionary Party politicians
People from Cozumel
Politicians from Quintana Roo
1968 births
Living people
21st-century Mexican politicians
Monterrey Institute of Technology and Higher Education alumni
Members of the Senate of the Republic (Mexico) for Quintana Roo
Senators of the LXII and LXIII Legislatures of Mexico